The Islander is a novel by the Newbery Medal winning author Cynthia Rylant, published in 1998 by Dorling Kindersley.

Plot summary
The book follows Daniel, whose parents have died; he goes to live with his grandfather on a remote gray island off British Columbia.  Together they live an extremely lonely life, hardly talking to anyone. That loneliness soon lifts from Daniel when he meets a mermaid.  He returns to the shore later, hoping to meet her again, but instead finds a sea otter, who then tosses him a seashell which contains a key.  As he explores the mysteries of the key he soon grows closer with his grandfather.

External links
 

1998 American novels
Children's fantasy novels
American children's novels
Novels set in British Columbia
DK (publisher) books
1998 children's books